Autas or Awtas is a location in Saudi Arabia where the Battle of Hunayn and the Battle of Autas took place.

Awtas is located between Mecca and Taif at a distance of fourteen to fifteen Miles from Mecca. It is located in the Hunayn or Hunain Valley of the Sarawat Mountains.   The location, on the Meccah to Taif Road, is a wide arid valley surrounded by barren rocky mountains.

References
 

History of Saudi Arabia